Joan Costa-i-Font (born 20 September 1974 in Barcelona) is a Spanish born British economist, specialised in Health economics. He has made important contributions to the behavioral and institutional design of health and long-term care programs, and the study of the origins and economic consequences of health disadvantage.

Biography

He holds a PhD in Economics and an MSc from the London School of Economics and Political Science and undergraduate degrees in economics, law and political science from the University of Barcelona.  He works as an Associate Professor (Reader) at the London School of Economics and Political Science and has held research appointments at UCL, Harvard University, Oxford University and Boston College.

Publications

" Social economics: current and emerging avenues" with Macis, M. The MIT Press, Cambridge. 
"Federalism and decentralization in European health and social care" with Scott Greer. Palgrave Macmillan, Basingstoke, UK. 
"The LSE companion to health policy" with Alistair McGuire.  Edward Elgar, Cheltenham, UK. 
" Financing long-term care in Europe: institutions, markets and models" with Courbage, C. Palgrave Macmillan, Basingstoke, UK. 
 The Economics of New Health Technologies with Alistair McGuire and Christophe Courbage. (2010) Oxford University Press
"Reforming Long-term Care in Europe". (2011) [Wiley]

References

External links
 Joan Costa-i-Font's CV at LSE
 LSE Staff Profile

1974 births
Living people
Economists from Catalonia
People from Barcelona
Alumni of the London School of Economics
Academics of the London School of Economics
University of Barcelona alumni